John Howard Lawson (September 25, 1894 – August 11, 1977) was an American writer, specializing in plays and screenplays. After starting with plays for theaters in New York City, he worked in Hollywood on writing for films. He was the first president of the Writers Guild of America, West after the Screen Writers Guild divided into two regional organizations.

Lawson was one of the Hollywood Ten, the first group of American film industry professionals to be blacklisted by Congress during the 1950s McCarthy era's investigation of communist influence in Hollywood. He and his colleagues refused to testify; he was convicted of contempt of Congress and served a year in prison. He moved to Mexico, where he wrote some books about theater. After returning to the US, he taught at some universities in California. Using a pseudonym, he wrote the screenplay for Cry, the Beloved Country (1951), an adaptation of Alan Paton's novel about South Africa that was critical of apartheid.

Life and career

Early life and education
John Howard Lawson was born on September 25, 1894, in New York City to parents originally named Simeon Levy and Belle Hart, who were Jewish. Before their first child was born, his father changed the family name from Levy to Lawson, joking that this was so that his son could "obtain reservations at expensive resort hotels". In the 1880s, Lawson's father was living in Mexico City, where he started a newspaper, the Mexican Financie. When John was five, his mother died. She had named her three children after people she admired: John Howard Lawson was named after prison reformer John Howard, his sister Adelaide Jaffery Lawson was named after a friend of hers who was active in social causes, and Wendell Holmes Lawson was named after reforming American jurist Oliver Wendell Holmes, Jr.

As a successful businessman, Simeon sent his children to private schools. At age seven, John attended Elizabeth and Alexis Ferms' "Children's Playhouse" school, an experimental school for children. Later he and his siblings went to Halstead School in Yonkers, New York and then to Cutler School in New Rochelle, New York. In 1906, Simeon sent the three children on a tour of Europe, and seeing theatre was on the list of activities. John Howard took notes on the set designs, actors, and plays. In 1909, they were sent on a tour of the United States and Canada.

After studying at Williams College (1910–1914) and graduating with a B.A., Lawson became a successful writer, gaining production of early plays such as Standards (1916) and Servant-Master-Lover (1916). While he was at Williams, his brother Wendell studied music and art in Germany. Lawson was attracted to works by Karl Kautsky because of his sense of alienation. He contributed to The Williams College Monthly. He also served as an editor of the senior-class book and a member of the varsity debating team. He was known to other students as a good-natured iconoclast and a frequent speaker at undergraduate meetings. After graduating, he worked as an editor at Reuters from 1914 to 1915.

Early career
Lawson wrote his first play, A Hindoo Love Drama, while at Williams. Mary Kirkpatrick, faculty leader of the  Williams College Drama Club, was impressed by this effort and encouraged him. Lawson was inspired to write three plays in 1915-1916: Standards, The Spice of Life, and Servant-Master-Lover.

Standards was bought by George M. Cohan and Sam Harris, and was given a tryout in Albany and Syracuse in 1915. It never made it to Broadway. Oliver Morosco produced Servant-Master-Lover in a run in Los Angeles, but received bad reviews.

World War I
When the United States entered World War I in 1917, Lawson was opposed to joining. His father helped him to get a position in the Norton-Harjes Volunteer Ambulance Corps. In June 1917, he left for Europe and aboard the ship met John Dos Passos, also a writer. In November, when Norton-Haryes was folded into the American Red Cross's Ambulance Service, Dos Passos and Lawson decided to become drivers; they went to Italy. At this time, Dos Passos was working on One Man's Initiation: 1917 and Lawson on Roger Bloomer. While serving, they were outfitted to Paris. Lawson attended performances of the Comédie-Française and Sergey Diaghilev's Ballets Russes. In January 1918, Dos Passos wrote a letter that was critical of the ambulance company. It somehow reached Red Cross officials, and they forced Dos Passos to resign. Lawson was under suspicion for his attitudes, as well, but he managed to stay in Italy and do public-relations work for the Red Cross.

In the spring of 1919, Lawson returned to Paris from Italy. He married Katharine (Kate) Drain, who was a volunteer nurses' aide. She later worked as an actress. They had a child together but divorced by 1923.

Post War
After the war Lawson and Kate lived and worked in Rome, where he edited a newspaper. He lived in Paris in 1920–1921, where he completed Roger Bloomer. This was Lawson's first show to reach Broadway, where it opened on March 1, 1923. It was put on by the Equity Players and ran for fifty performances.

His next show, Processional, opened on Broadway on January 12, 1925, produced by the Theatre Guild. It ran for 96 performances. The production, however, failed financially, and the Theatre Guild told Lawson that they would not stage any more expressionistic plays. It was later revived in 1937 for the Federal Theatre Project during the Great Depression, when it received critical and popular acclaim.

Lawson was fascinated by the works he saw when in 1926 the New York International Theatrical Exposition showcased experimental European cubist, futurist, and constructivist plays. After seeing these, Lawson, Dos Passos, and Michael Gold (founder/editor of The New Masses magazine) formed the Workers Drama League to produce revolutionary plays. One production and a few weeks later, the three men disbanded. They joined Em Jo Basshe and Francis Edward Faragoh, and formed the New Playwrights Theatre. This lasted until 1929; they were supported largely by funding from millionaire businessman Otto Hermann Kahn.

March 3, 1926 was the premiere of Lawson's Nirvana at the Greenwich Village Theatre, which ran for six performances. The play calls for a new religion to help people survive the swirling cyclone of jazz, new machinery, great buildings, science fiction, tabloids, and radio. Lawson's reputation after Processional and the notable set design by Mordecai Gorelik are considered to have helped it gain the six showings.

In late 1926, Lawson, along with Dos Passos and Gold, who together were on the National Executive Committee attempting to found the Proletarian Artists and Writers League. A similar Soviet Union organization offered some financial backing to them. In August 1927, Dos Passos, Gold, and Lawson went to Boston to protest the Sacco and Vanzetti trial. In his diary afterword, Lawson would write that he could "neither ignore the flaws in American politics and economics nor bring himself to become more deeply involved in the struggle".

The first play produced by the New Playwrights Theatre, Lawson's Loud Speaker, opened on March 7, 1927, at the 52nd Street Theatre and ran for forty-two performances. He had been intrigued by the ceremonial laying of the cornerstone at the new Theatre Guild playhouse in 1924, an event attended by both Governor Alfred E. Smith of New York and Otto Kahn. In his play, Lawson explored the concept of Kahn as governor rather than Smith.

Hollywood
While Lawson was working in Hollywood, New Playwrights Theatre decided to produce his play, The International, with set design by John Dos Passos. It opened on January 12, 1928, and ran for twenty-seven performances.

In 1928, Lawson moved to Hollywood, where he wrote scripts for films such as The Ship for Shanghai, Bachelor Apartment, and Goodbye Love.  In the winter of 1930–1931, during the Great Depression,  Lawson wrote Success Story. The Theatre Guild rejected the script, but Harold Clurman, a reader for them, had recently formed the Group Theatre and needed new scripts. Clurman and Lawson reworked the play during the summer of 1932, and Success Story opened on September 26, 1932, for 121 performances. Lawson also adapted his play, Success at Any Price, for film, writing the screenplay for the 1934 work.

In 1933, Lester Cole, Samuel Ornitz, and Lawson helped to organize and become first presidents of the Screen Writers Guild. After Lawson was fired from Metro-Goldwyn-Mayer, he moved to Washington, D.C.  There he worked to have the group recognized by the National Labor Board for purposes of bargaining for screenwriters. While in D.C., Lawson's The Pure in Heart and Gentlewoman were being produced in New York.

Lawson wrote The Pure in Heart  while he was working on Success Story. The Theatre Guild agreed to produce the play, but closed it when the out-of-town tryout in Baltimore failed. After the Group Theatre also rejected the play, it was produced by Richard Aldrich and Alfred De Liagre. The Pure in Heart opened on March 20, 1933, and had a run of only seven performances.

Gentlewoman, completed in association with D. A. Doran Jr, was produced by the Group Theatre and opened on March 22, 1934. It ran for twelve performances.

During the 1930s, leftists accused Lawson of lacking ideological and political commitment. New Playwrights Theatre associate Mike Gold attacked him in The New Masses on April 10, 1934, describing him as "A Bourgeois Hamlet of Our Time", who wrote adolescent works that lacked moral fiber or clear ideas. Lawson responded a week later in The New Masses. In the article "'Inner Conflict' and Proletarian Art", he said his  middle-class childhood prevented him from fully understanding the working people. He acknowledged that his prosperity and Hollywood connections were suspect in the fight for workers' rights. Due to the criticism, he officially joined the Communist Party in 1934 and began to educate himself about the proletarian cause. He soon traveled throughout the poverty-stricken South to study violent labor conflicts in Alabama and Georgia, where workers were trying to unionize.

While in the South, Lawson submitted articles to the Daily Worker; he was arrested numerous times. These experiences inspired his next play, Marching Song. It was produced by the radical Theatre Union, opening in New York on February 17, 1937, and running for sixty-one performances.

Lawson wrote the screenplay for several films during the 1930s that were political, including Blockade (1938), which starred Henry Fonda. This film on the Spanish Civil War earned him a nomination for the Academy Award for Best Story.  Lawson also wrote Counter-Attack (1945), a tribute to the Soviet-USA alliance during the late stages of the Second World War.  He also wrote the critically acclaimed Algiers (1938), and the Humphrey Bogart vehicles Sahara and Action in the North Atlantic in 1943.

In 1941, Lawson ordered Budd Schulberg to make changes to his novel What Makes Sammy Run? to better fit the Communist message; Schulberg refused and quit the American Communist Party in protest. Lawson organized and led a critical attack in 1946 on Albert Maltz after he published an article, "What Shall We Ask of Writers", in The New Masses, challenging the didacticism of the American Communist Party's censorship of writers. Surprised by the ferocity of attack from his fellow writers, including Lawson, Howard Fast, Alvah Bessie, Ring Lardner, Jr., Samuel Sillen, and others, Maltz publicly recanted.

House Un-American Activities Committee (HUAC)
After World War II, American fears of communist power increased after the Soviet Union established communist governments in eastern Europe. The House Committee on Un-American Activities (HUAC) began an investigation into communist and socialist influence in the Hollywood motion picture industry. Lawson appeared before the HUAC on October 29, 1947. Like Alvah Bessie, Herbert Biberman, Albert Maltz, Adrian Scott, Dalton Trumbo, Lester Cole, Edward Dmytryk, Samuel Ornitz and Ring Lardner Jr., he refused to answer almost all questions and would not give names of other people he knew in communist circles. Known as the Hollywood Ten, they claimed that the First Amendment of the United States Constitution gave them the right to do this.  The HUAC and U.S. appeals courts, however, disagreed and all ten men were found guilty of contempt of Congress. Lawson was sentenced to twelve months in Ashland Prison and fined $1,000. They were known as the Hollywood Ten and were blacklisted from writing for Hollywood.

Once the communist domination of the League of American Writers had been publicly declared, by Francis Biddle adding it to the Attorney General's List of Subversive Organizations, its Hollywood branch renamed itself as the Hollywood Writers’ Mobilization, led by Lawson.

In 1951, Edward Dmytryk testified before HUAC that Lawson, among others, had pressured him to put communist propaganda in his films.

Post blacklist
Blacklisted by the Hollywood studios, Lawson moved to Mexico where he began writing Marxist interpretations of drama and film-making, such as The Hidden Heritage (1950), Film in the Battle of Ideas (1953), and Film: The Creative Process (1964). He also wrote one of the first anti-apartheid movies, Cry, the Beloved Country (1951), with a screenplay published under a pseudonym.
Despite the blacklist, Lawson was hired to teach at several American universities including: Stanford University, Loyola Marymount University, and Los Angeles University of Judaism.

In his book Film in the Battle of Ideas, Lawson wrote that "the rulers of the United States take the film very seriously as an instrument of propaganda" and said they believed that the influence of Hollywood movies was used to "poison the minds of U.S. working-class people". He believed that was inaccurate about U.S. working-class life. Lawson wrote that Hollywood "falsifies the life of American workers" and its "unwritten law decrees that only the middle and upper classes provide themes suitable for film presentation, and that workers appear on the screen only in subordinate or comic roles." According to Lawson, "workers and their families see films which urge them to despise the values by which they live, and to emulate the corrupt values of their enemies" and "the consistent presentation on the nation's screens of the views that working-class life is to be despised and that workers who seek to protect their class interests are stupid, malicious, or even treasonable" is what Hollywood engages in.

Lawson argued that Hollywood promoted degrading images of women in the first half of the 20th century. He said, "Hollywood treats 'glamour' and sex appeal as the sum-total of woman's personality" and "portraits of women in Hollywood films fall into three general categories: the woman as a criminal or the instigator of crime; the woman as man's enemy, fighting and losing - for she must always lose - in the battle of the sexes; the woman as a `primitive' child, fulfilling the male dream of a totally submissive vehicle of physical pleasure." Lawson also argued that in most U.S. movies, "when a woman succeeds in the world of competition, Hollywood holds that her success is achieved by trickery, deceit, and the amoral use of sexual appeal."

The manuscript of his unpublished autobiography is held at Southern Illinois University Carbondale in Carbondale, Illinois.

Religion
Lawson was born into a wealthy Jewish family. His father had changed their surname from Levy to one of English style. As a boy, Lawson went to the house of a Christian schoolmate, where he mentioned his father's real name was Levy. He was not invited to the house again. He claimed he faced social discrimination.

His father then insisted that the family join a Christian church. They joined the First Church at 96th Street and Central Park West. However John Howard Lawson would adhere to Jewish dietary laws all his life.

While at Williams College, during his sophomore year Lawson was denied election to the editorial board of The Williams College Monthly because some students raised questions about his Jewish background. He would later say that it was a good experience because it forced him "to begin his struggle to come to terms with his Jewish identity".

Works

Theatre
 A Hindoo Love Drama (1915)
 The Spice of Life (1915)
 Servant-Master-Lover (1916)
 Standards (1916)
 Roger Bloomer (1923)
 Processional (1925)
 Nirvana (1926)
 Loud Speaker (1927)
 The International (1928)
 Success Story (1933)
 The Pure in Heart (1934)
 Gentlewoman (1934)
 Marching Song (1937)
 Parlor Magic (1963)

Film
 Dream of Love (1928), with Dorothy Farnum, Marion Ainslee, and Ruth Cummings
 The Pagan (1929), with Dorothy Farnum
 Dynamite (1929), with Jeanie MacPherson
 The Sea Bat (1930), with Dorothy Yost and Bess Meredyth
 Our Blushing Brides (1930), with Bess Meredyth and Helen Mainard
 The Ship From Shanghai (1930)
 Bachelor Apartment (1931), with J. Walter Rubin
 Good-bye Love (1933)
 Success at Any Price (1934), with others
 Treasure Island (1934), with John Lee Mahin and Leonard Praskins
 Party Wire (1935), with Ethel Hill
 Adventure in Manhattan (1936), adaption uncredited
 Blockade (1938)
 Algiers (1938), with James M. Cain
 They Shall Have Music (1939), with Irma von Cube
 Earthbound (1940), with Samuel C. Engel
 Four Sons (1940), with Milton Sperling
 Action in the North Atlantic (1943)
 Sahara (1943 American film) (1943)
 Counter-Attack (1945)
 Smash-Up, the Story of a Woman (1947)
 Cry, the Beloved Country (1952), with Alan Paton
 The Careless Years (1957), with Mitch Lindemann

Writings
 Theory and Technique of Playwrighting, Putnam, 1936; enlarged edition published as Theory and Technique of Playwriting and Screenwriting, Putnam, 1949.
 The Hidden Heritage: A Rediscovery of the Ideas and Forces That Link the Thought of Our Time with the Culture of the Past, Citadel, 1950, 1st revised edition, 1968.
 Film in the Battle of Ideas, Masses & Mainstream, 1953.
 Film, The Creative Process: The Search for an Audio-Visual Language and Structure, Hill and Wang, 1964, 2nd revised edition, 1967.

Introductions
 Ten Days that Shook the World by John Reed, New York, International Publishers, 1967.
 People's Theatre in Amerika by Karen M. Taylor, New York: Drama Books, 1972.

See also
List of ambulance drivers during World War I

Notes

References
.

Further reading
Horne, Gerald (2006), The Final Victim of the Blacklist: John Howard Lawson, Dean of the Hollywood Ten, Berkeley and Los Angeles: University of California Press.
Lawson, John Howard (1949), The Theory and Technique of Playwriting and Screenwriting, New York: G.P. Putnam's.

External links

 
 
John Howard Lawson Papers, 1905-1969 at Southern Illinois University Carbondale, Special Collections Research Center
Various books by John Howard Lawson online

1894 births
1977 deaths
Members of the Communist Party USA
20th-century American dramatists and playwrights
American people of World War I
American male screenwriters
Hollywood blacklist
Modernist theatre
Writers from New York City
Stanford University faculty
Loyola Marymount University faculty
Williams College alumni
Jewish American dramatists and playwrights
Jewish American screenwriters
Marxist writers
Communist writers
American male dramatists and playwrights
Screenwriters from California
Screenwriters from New York (state)
20th-century American male writers
20th-century American screenwriters